Nanjing Jinling High School (or Jin-Zhong/金中 for short) is a public high school located in Gulou District, Nanjing, Jiangsu, China.

History

American missionaries of Methodist Episcopal Church in China founded Fowler Biblical School in 1888 and established its high school branch in 1890. Fowler Biblical School was reorganized as Jinling University (University of Nanking) since 1910 and the high school branch had been therefore called High School Affiliated to Jinling University (金陵大学附属中学) and Jinling High School for short.

In 1937, the school was relocated to Chongqing due to the Second Sino-Japanese War. During the Nanking Massacre, the school's campus was part of the Nanking Safety Zone, where civilians were protected from the slaughter by Japanese troops. The school restored its operation in Nanjing in 1939, which was fully recovered in 1946 after the war.

The school's name was changed to Nanjing No. 10 Middle School (南京市第十中学) in 1951 following the merger with the High School Affiliated to Ginling College (金陵女子文理学院附属中学). The school's original name "Jinling High School" was restored in 1988 before the centennial anniversary.

Jinling High School International Department was established in 2008.

Architecture
Fowler Biblical School chapel (汇文书院钟楼), which is located on the main campus, was constructed in 1888 and rebuilt in 1917. It was the first 3-storey building in Nanjing. In 2006 it was recognized as a Major Sites Protected at the National Level as part of the former site of University of Nanking.

Culture
H. S. Thompson's "Annie Lisle", with lyrics written by Xiaoshi Hu, has been used as the official anthem of Jinling High School since the 1930s.

The school's motto is "Honesty, Truth, Diligence, Benevolence" (诚、真、勤、仁).

The school celebrates its anniversary on 2 October, a "Food Festival" (美食节) on 31 December and several Sports Days in October.

The school publishes several student-run campus magazines every quarter.

Athletics
The boys' soccer team has been the national champion for many times as early as the 1930s. The girls' basketball team has recently triumphed at the Asian championship and the National championship.

Notable alumni

Li Yining, economist.
Tian Gang, mathematician and leader of differential coefficient geometry.
Gao Xingjian, Nobel Laureate in Literature.
Qi Kang, member of the Chinese Academy of Sciences.
Wu Zhonghua, physicist.
Wei Qingcheng, the founder of the Green Exposition Garden.
Sebastiano Serafini, musical composer, singer and model very well known in Asia especially in Japan.

Hexi campus
Jinling High School Hexi Campus is a private high school affiliated with Jinling High School. It is located in the Hexi region in Jianye District, near Nanjing Olympic Sports Center.

References

External links
 Official website in Chinese

High schools in Nanjing